Events in chess in 1904:

News

 The 1904 Cambridge Springs International Chess Congress is the first major international chess tournament in America in the twentieth century. It featured the participation of World Champion Emanuel Lasker, who had not played a tournament since 1900 and would not play again until 1909.  American Frank Marshall was the surprise winner.
 The first British Chess Championship organized by the British Chess Federation is held in Hastings.  William Ewart Napier wins the men's championship and Kate Belinda Finn wins the women's championship.
 The American Chess Bulletin is founded in New York City by Hermann Helms (1870–1963).  Helms is the editor for the entire run of the magazine, which ceases publication in 1962.
 The first official Berlin City Chess Championship is won by Horatio Caro, followed by Ossip Bernstein, Rudolf Spielmann, Wilhelm Cohn, Benjamin Blumenfeld, etc.

Births

 Erik Andersen
 Mary Bain
 Anneliese Brandler
 Victor Buerger
 Ugo Calà
 Vicente Almirall Castell
 Marie Jeanne Frigard
 Henri Grob
 Jón Guðmundsson
 Karl Helling
 Leho Laurine
 Jacob Levin
 Erik Lundin
 Gottlieb Machate
 Vladimir Makogonov
 Ariah Mohiliver
 Federico Norcia
 Alexander Pituk
 Ludwig Rellstab
 Carlos Torre Repetto
 Lyudmila Rudenko
 Anthony Santasiere
 Gösta Stoltz
 Erling Tholfsen
 A. R. B. Thomas

Deaths

 Willard Fiske (11 November 1831 – 7 September 1904), American librarian and scholar, chess writer, helped organize the first American Chess Congress in 1857.
 Daniel Yarnton Mills (29 August 1849 – 17 December 1904), eight-time Scottish chess champion.
 George Salmon (25 September 1819 – 22 January 1904), Irish mathematician, chess player.
 Emanuel Schiffers (4 May [O.S. 22 April] 1850 – 12 December [O.S. 29 November] 1904), Russian chess player and chess writer.
 Berthold Suhle (1 January 1837 – 26 January 1904), German chess player and chess writer.

References

 
20th century in chess
Chess by year